Ben Martin may refer to:

Ben Martin (American football) (1921–2004), American football player and coach
Ben Martin (footballer, born 1986), Liberian footballer
Ben Martin (footballer, born 1982), English footballer
Ben Martin (golfer) (born 1987), American golfer
Ben Martin (photographer) (1930–2017), American photographer 
Ben Martin, musician in Clem Snide
Ben Martin, a fictional character in A Crush on You

See also
Benjamin Martin (disambiguation)
Benedict Martin (born 1987), Malaysian footballer
Ben Martins (born 1956), former Minister of Energy in South Africa